Arthrobacter pigmenti is a bacterium species from the genus of Arthrobacter which has been isolated from a biofilm from a mural painting in Herberstein, Austria.

References

Further reading

External links
Type strain of Arthrobacter pigmenti at BacDive -  the Bacterial Diversity Metadatabase

Bacteria described in 2005
Micrococcaceae